Pe is a letter in the Persian alphabet used to represent the voiceless bilabial plosive ⟨p⟩.

It is used in Persian, Kurdish, Pashto, Balochi, and other Iranian languages, Uyghur, Urdu, Sindhi, Kashmiri, Shina, and Turkic languages (before the Latin and Cyrillic scripts were adopted).

In Egypt, the letter is called  ("be with three dots").

Character encodings

See also
ﭺ - Che (Persian)
ژ - Zhe (Arabic)
ﭪ - Ve (Arabic)
گ - Gaf (Persian)

References 

Persian letters